Faramarz was one of Iranian pahlavans in Shahnameh.

Faramarz may also refer to:
Faramarz-nama, a Persian epic recounting the adventures of Faramarz
Faramarz (given name)
Faramarz, Iran, a village
Faramarz Kola, a village in Iran
Faramarz, former name of Iranian frigate Sahand

See also
Faramarzi (disambiguation)